Xiangshan Campus, China Academy of Art station is a metro station on Line 6 of the Hangzhou Metro in China. It was opened on 30 December 2020. Here the train service of Line 6 will split into two directions. It is located in the Xihu District of Hangzhou, near the Xiangshan Campus of China Academy of Art.

Station layout

Gallery

References 

Railway stations in Zhejiang
Railway stations in China opened in 2020
Hangzhou Metro stations